Thomas Veitch may refer to:

Tommy Veitch (1949–1987), Scottish professional footballer
Tom Veitch (1941–2022), American writer